Amphizoa lecontei is a species of aquatic beetle. Adults have a body length of between 11.5 and 16 millimeters. Its elytron has a distinct carina on fifth interval. The species is found in western North America, especially in the Rocky Mountains. Its common name is "Trout-stream beetle". Its synonym is Amphizoa carinata.

References

Adephaga
Beetles described in 1872